The prince-electors (  pl. ,), or electors for short, were the members of the electoral college that elected the emperor of the Holy Roman Empire.

From the 13th century onwards, the prince-electors had the privilege of electing the monarch who would be crowned by the pope. After 1508, there were no imperial coronations and the election was sufficient. Charles V (elected in 1519) was the last emperor to be crowned (1530); his successors were elected emperors by the electoral college, each being titled "Elected Emperor of the Romans".

The dignity of elector carried great prestige and was considered to be second only to that of king or emperor. The electors held exclusive privileges that were not shared with other princes of the Empire, and they continued to hold their original titles alongside that of elector.

The heir apparent to a secular prince-elector was known as an electoral prince.

Rights and privileges 
They were, until the 18th century, exclusively entitled to be addressed with the title  (Serene Highness).

As rulers of Imperial Estates, the electors enjoyed all the privileges of Imperial Princes, including the right to enter into alliances, to autonomy in relation to dynastic affairs, and to precedence over other subjects. The Golden Bull granted them the Privilegium de non appellando, which prevented their subjects from lodging an appeal to a higher Imperial court. However, while this privilege, and some others, were automatically granted to Electors, they were not exclusive to them and many of the larger Imperial Estates were also to be individually granted some or all those rights and privileges.

Imperial Diet 
The electors, like the other princes ruling States of the Empire, were members of the Imperial Diet, which was divided into three collegia: the Council of Electors, the Council of Princes, and the Council of Cities. In addition to being members of the Council of Electors, most electors were also members of the Council of Princes by virtue of possessing territory or holding ecclesiastical position. The assent of both bodies was required for important decisions affecting the structure of the Empire, such as the creation of new electorates or States of the Empire.

Many electors ruled a number of States of the Empire or held several ecclesiastical titles, and therefore had multiple votes in the Council of Princes. In 1792, the Elector of Brandenburg had eight votes, the Elector of Bavaria six votes, the Elector of Hanover six votes, the King of Bohemia three votes, the Elector-Archbishop of Trier three votes, the Elector-Archbishop of Cologne two votes, and the Elector-Archbishop of Mainz one vote. Thus, of the hundred votes in the Council of Princes in 1792, twenty-nine belonged to electors, giving them considerable influence in the Council of Princes in addition to their positions as electors.

In addition to voting by colleges or councils, the Imperial Diet also voted in religious coalitions, as provided for in the Peace of Westphalia. The division into religious bodies was on the basis of the official religion of the state, and not of its rulers.

Elections 

The electors were originally summoned by the Archbishop of Mainz within one month of an Emperor's death, and met within three months of being summoned. During the interregnum, imperial power was exercised by two imperial vicars. Each vicar, in the words of the Golden Bull, was "the administrator of the empire itself, with the power of passing judgments, of presenting to ecclesiastical benefices, of collecting returns and revenues and investing with fiefs, of receiving oaths of fealty for and in the name of the holy empire". The Elector of Saxony was vicar in areas operating under Saxon law (Saxony, Westphalia, Hannover, and northern Germany), while the Elector Palatine was vicar in the remainder of the Empire (Franconia, Swabia, the Rhine, and southern Germany). The Elector of Bavaria replaced the Elector Palatine in 1623, but when the latter was granted a new electorate in 1648, there was a dispute between the two as to which was vicar. In 1659, both purported to act as vicar, but ultimately, the other vicar recognized the Elector of Bavaria. Later, the two electors made a pact to act as joint vicars, but the Imperial Diet rejected the agreement. In 1711, while the Elector of Bavaria was under the ban of the Empire, the Elector Palatine again acted as vicar, but his cousin was restored to his position upon his restoration three years later.

Finally, in 1745, the two agreed to alternate as vicars, with Bavaria starting first. This arrangement was upheld by the Imperial Diet in 1752. In 1777, the question was settled when the Elector Palatine inherited Bavaria. On many occasions, however, there was no interregnum, as a new king had been elected during the lifetime of the previous Emperor.

Frankfurt regularly served as the site of the election from the fifteenth century on, but elections were also held at Cologne (1531), Regensburg (1575 and 1636), and Augsburg (1653 and 1690). An elector could appear in person or could appoint another elector as his proxy. More often, an electoral suite or embassy was sent to cast the vote; the credentials of such representatives were verified by the Archbishop of Mainz, who presided over the ceremony. The deliberations were held at the city hall, but voting occurred in the cathedral. Under the Golden Bull, a majority of electors sufficed to elect a king, and each elector could cast only one vote. Electors were free to vote for whomsoever they pleased (including themselves), but dynastic considerations played a great part in the choice.

The capitulation may be described as a contract between the princes and the king, the latter conceding rights and powers to the electors and other princes. Once an individual swore to abide by the electoral capitulation, he assumed the office of King of the Romans.

In the 10th and 11th centuries, princes often acted merely to confirm hereditary succession in the Saxon Ottonian dynasty and Franconian Salian dynasty. But with the actual formation of the prince-elector class, elections became more open, starting with the election of Lothair II in 1125. The Staufen dynasty managed to get its sons formally elected in their fathers' lifetimes almost as a formality. After these lines ended in extinction, the electors began to elect kings from different families so that the throne would not once again settle within a single dynasty.

For some two centuries, the monarchy was elective both in theory and in practice; the arrangement, however, did not last, since the powerful House of Habsburg managed to secure succession within their dynasty during the fifteenth century. All kings elected from 1438 onwards were from among the Habsburg Archdukes of Austria (and later Kings of Hungary and Bohemia) until 1740, when the archduchy was inherited by a woman, Maria Theresa, sparking the War of the Austrian Succession.

A representative of the House of Wittelsbach was elected for a short period of time, but in 1745, Maria Theresa's husband, Francis I of the Habsburg-Lorraine dynasty, became King. All of his successors were also from the same family. Hence, for the greater part of the Empire's history, the role of the electors was largely ceremonial.

High offices 

Each elector held a "High Office of the Empire" analogous to a modern Cabinet office and was a member of the (ceremonial) Imperial Household. The three spiritual electors were Archchancellors: the Archbishop of Mainz was Archchancellor of Germany, the Archbishop of Cologne was Archchancellor of Italy, and the Archbishop of Trier was Archchancellor of Burgundy. The six remaining were secular electors, who were granted augmentations to their arms reflecting their position in the Household. These augments were displayed either as an inset badge, as in the case of the Arch-Steward, Treasurer, and Chamberlain—or dexter, as in the case of the Arch-Marshal and Arch-Bannerbearer. Or, as in the case of the Arch-Cupbearer, the augment was integrated into the escutcheon, held in the royal Bohemian lion's right paw.

When the Duke of Bavaria replaced the Elector Palatine in 1623, he assumed the latter's office of Arch-Steward. When the Count Palatine was granted a new electorate, he assumed the position of Arch-Treasurer of the Empire. When the Duke of Bavaria was banned in 1706, the Elector Palatine returned to the office of Arch-Steward, and in 1710, the Elector of Hanover was promoted to the post of Arch-Treasurer. Matters were complicated by the Duke of Bavaria's restoration in 1714; the Elector of Bavaria resumed the office of Arch-Steward, while the Elector Palatine returned to the post of Arch-Treasurer, and the Elector of Hanover was given the new office of Archbannerbearer. The Electors of Hanover, however, continued to be styled Arch-Treasurers, though the Elector Palatine was the one who actually exercised the office until 1777, when he inherited Bavaria and the Arch-Stewardship. After 1777, no further changes were made to the Imperial Household; new offices were planned for the Electors admitted in 1803, but the Empire was abolished before they could be created. The Duke of Württemberg, however, started to adopt the trappings of the Arch-Bannerbearer.

Many High Officers were entitled to use "augmentations" on their coats of arms; said augmentations, which were special marks of honor, appeared in the middle of the electors' shields (as shown in the image above) atop the other charges (in heraldic terms, the augmentations appeared in the form of inescutcheons). The Arch-Steward used gules an orb Or (a gold orb on a red field). The Arch-Marshal used the more complicated per fess sable and argent, two swords in saltire gules (two red swords arranged in the form of a saltire, on a black and white field). The Arch-Chamberlain's augmentation was azure a scepter palewise Or (a golden scepter on a blue field), while the Arch-Treasurer's was gules the crown of Charlemagne Or (a gold crown on a red field). As noted above, the Elector Palatine and the Elector of Hanover styled themselves Arch-Treasurer from 1714 until 1777; during this time, both electors used the corresponding augmentations. The three Arch-Chancellors and the Arch-Cupbearer, however, did not use any augmentations.

The electors discharged the ceremonial duties associated with their offices only during coronations, where they bore the crown and regalia of the Empire. Otherwise, they were represented by holders of corresponding "Hereditary Offices of the Household". The Arch-Butler was represented by the Hereditary Butler (Cupbearer) (the Count of Althann), the Arch-Seneschal by the Hereditary Steward (the Count of Waldburg, who adopted the title into their name as "Truchsess von Waldburg"), the Arch-Chamberlain by the Hereditary Chamberlain (the Count of Hohenzollern), the Arch-Marshal by the Hereditary Marshal (the Count of Pappenheim), and the Arch-Treasurer by the Hereditary Treasurer (the Count of Sinzendorf). After 1803, the Duke of Württemberg as Arch-Bannerbearer assigned the count of Zeppelin-Aschhausen as Hereditary Bannerbearer.

History 

The German practice of electing monarchs began when ancient Germanic tribes formed ad hoc coalitions and elected the leaders thereof. Elections were irregularly held by the Franks, whose successor states include France and the Holy Roman Empire. The French monarchy eventually became hereditary, but the Holy Roman Emperors remained elective, at least in theory, although the Habsburgs provided most of the later monarchs. While all free men originally exercised the right to vote in such elections, suffrage eventually came to be limited to the leading men of the realm. In the election of Lothar II in 1125, a small number of eminent nobles chose the monarch and then submitted him to the remaining magnates for their approbation.

Soon, the right to choose the monarch was settled on an exclusive group of princes, and the procedure of seeking the approval of the remaining nobles was abandoned. The college of electors was mentioned in 1152 and again in 1198. The composition of electors at that time is unclear, but appears to have included representatives of the church and the dukes of the four nations of Germany: the Franks (Duchy of Franconia), Swabians (Duchy of Swabia), Saxons (Duchy of Saxony) and Bavarians (Duchy of Bavaria).

1257 to Thirty Years' War 

The electoral college is known to have existed by 1152, but its composition is unknown. A letter written by Pope Urban IV in 1265 suggests that by "immemorial custom", seven princes had the right to elect the King and future Emperor. The pope wrote that the seven electors were those who had just voted in the election of 1257, which resulted in the election of two kings.

 Three ecclesiastical Electors:
 The Archbishop of Mainz
 The Archbishop of Trier
 The Archbishop of Cologne
 Four secular Electors:
 The King of Bohemia
 The Count Palatine of the Rhine
 The Duke of Saxony
 The Margrave of Brandenburg

The three Archbishops oversaw the most venerable and powerful sees in Germany, while the other four were supposed to represent the dukes of the four nations. The Count Palatine of the Rhine held most of the former Duchy of Franconia after the last Duke died in 1039. The Margrave of Brandenburg became an Elector when the Duchy of Swabia was dissolved after the last Duke of Swabia was beheaded in 1268. Saxony, even with diminished territory, retained its eminent position.

The Palatinate and Bavaria were originally (since 1214) held by the same individual, but in 1253, they were divided between two members of the House of Wittelsbach. The other electors refused to allow two princes from the same dynasty to have electoral rights, so a heated rivalry arose between the Count Palatine and the Duke of Bavaria over who should hold the Wittelsbach seat.

Meanwhile, the King of Bohemia, who held the ancient imperial office of Arch-Cupbearer, asserted his right to participate in elections. Sometimes he was challenged on the grounds that his kingdom was not German, though usually he was recognized, instead of Bavaria which after all was just a younger line of Wittelsbachs.

The Declaration of Rhense issued in 1338 had the effect that election by the majority of the electors automatically conferred the royal title and rule over the empire, without papal confirmation. The Golden Bull of 1356 finally resolved the disputes among the electors. Under it, the Archbishops of Mainz, Trier, and Cologne, as well as the King of Bohemia, the Count Palatine of the Rhine, the Duke of Saxony, and the Margrave of Brandenburg held the right to elect the King.

The college's composition remained unchanged until the 17th century, although the Electorate of Saxony was transferred from the senior to the junior branch of the Wettin family in 1547, in the aftermath of the Schmalkaldic War.

Thirty Years' War to Napoleon 

In 1621, the Elector Palatine, Frederick V, came under the imperial ban after participating in the Bohemian Revolt (a part of the Thirty Years' War). The Elector Palatine's seat was conferred on the Duke of Bavaria, the head of a junior branch of his family. Originally, the Duke held the electorate personally, but it was later made hereditary along with the duchy. When the Thirty Years' War concluded with the Peace of Westphalia in 1648, a new electorate was created for the Count Palatine of the Rhine. Since the Elector of Bavaria retained his seat, the number of electors increased to eight; the two Wittelsbach lines were now sufficiently estranged so as not to pose a combined potential threat.

In 1685, the religious composition of the College of Electors was disrupted when a Catholic branch of the Wittelsbach family inherited the Palatinate. A new Protestant electorate was created in 1692 for the Duke of Brunswick-Lüneburg, who became known as the Elector of Hanover (the Imperial Diet officially confirmed the creation in 1708). The Elector of Saxony converted to Catholicism in 1697 so that he could become King of Poland, but no additional Protestant electors were created. Although the Elector of Saxony was personally Catholic, the Electorate itself remained officially Protestant, and the Elector even remained the leader of the Protestant body in the Reichstag.

In 1706, the Elector of Bavaria and Archbishop of Cologne were outlawed during the War of the Spanish Succession, but both were restored in 1714 after the Peace of Baden. In 1777, the number of electors was reduced to eight when the Elector Palatine inherited Bavaria.

Many changes to the composition of the college were necessitated by Napoleon's aggression during the early 19th century. The Treaty of Lunéville (1801), which ceded territory on the Rhine's left bank to France, led to the abolition of the archbishoprics of Trier and Cologne, and the transfer of the remaining spiritual Elector from Mainz to Regensburg. In 1803, electorates were created for the Duke of Württemberg, the Margrave of Baden, the Landgrave of Hesse-Kassel, and the Duke of Salzburg, bringing the total number of electors to ten. When Austria annexed Salzburg under the Treaty of Pressburg (1805), the Duke of Salzburg moved to the Grand Duchy of Würzburg and retained his electorate. None of the new electors, however, had an opportunity to cast votes, as the Holy Roman Empire was abolished in 1806, and the new electorates were never confirmed by the Emperor.

In 1788, the ruling family of Savoy pushed to receive an electoral title. Their ambition was backed by Brandenburg-Prussia. However, the French Revolution and subsequent Coalition Wars soon rendered this a moot point.Peter Wilson. "Heart of Europe: A History of the Holy Roman Empire." Cambridge: 2016. Page 227.

After the Empire 

After the abolition of the Holy Roman Empire in August 1806, the Electors continued to reign over their territories, many of them taking higher titles. The Electors of Bavaria, Württemberg, and Saxony styled themselves Kings, while the Electors of Baden, Regensburg, and Würzburg became Grand Dukes. The Elector of Hesse-Kassel, however, retained the meaningless title "Elector of Hesse", thus distinguishing himself from other Hessian princes (the Grand Duke of Hesse(-Darmstadt) and the Landgrave of Hesse-Homburg). Napoleon soon exiled him and Kassel was annexed to the Kingdom of Westphalia, a new creation. The King of Great Britain remained at war with Napoleon and continued to style himself Elector of Hanover, while the Hanoverian government continued to operate in London.

The Congress of Vienna accepted the Electors of Bavaria, Württemberg, and Saxony as Kings, along with the newly created Grand Dukes (less those of Würzburg and Frankfurt. The Elector of Hanover finally joined his fellow Electors by declaring himself the King of Hanover. The restored Elector of Hesse, a Napoleonic creation, tried to be recognized as the King of the Chatti. However, the European powers refused to acknowledge this title at the Congress of Aix-la-Chapelle (1818) and instead listed him with the Grand Dukes as a "Royal Highness". Believing the title of Prince-Elector to be superior in dignity to that of Grand Duke, the Elector of Hesse-Kassel chose to remain an Elector, even though there was no longer a Holy Roman Emperor to elect. Hesse-Kassel remained the only Electorate in Germany until 1866, when the country backed the losing side in the Austro-Prussian War and was absorbed into Prussia.

Spiritual

The Elector of Mainz was always a Roman Catholic.
The Elector of Trier was always a Roman Catholic.
The Elector of Cologne was usually a Roman Catholic, with the exception of Hermann V von Wied (Lutheran, 1542–1546) and Gebhard Truchsess von Waldburg (Reformed 1582–1588).

Secular
The King of Bohemia, who was also ruler of the lands of the Austrian Circle (primarily as the Archduke of Austria) and the King of Hungary from 1526, was usually a Roman Catholic. The exceptions were George of Podebrady (Hussite, 1457–1471) and Frederick I (Reformed, 1619–1620). 
The Margave of Brandenburg, who was also Duke of Prussia from 1618, King in Prussia from 1701, and King of Prussia from 1772, was Roman Catholic until 1539, then Lutheran until 1613, then Reformed until the end of the Empire.
The Count Palatine of the Rhine was Roman Catholic until the 1530s, then Lutheran until 1559, then Reformed until 1575, then again Lutheran until 1583, then again Reformed until 1623, when the electoral dignity was lost to Bavaria.
The Duke of Saxony was Roman Catholic until 1525, then Lutheran until 1697, and then again Roman Catholic.

Added in the 17th century
The Duke of Bavaria, added in 1623 and restored in 1714, was always Roman Catholic.
The Duke of Brunswick-Lüneburg, added in 1692, was Lutheran until 1714, when he became King of Great Britain and also the head of the Anglican Church of England.

Added in the 19th century
The Elector of Regensburg (added in 1801), Karl Theodor Anton Maria von Dalberg, was Catholic.
The Elector of Salzburg (1803–1805) and Würzburg (1805–1806) Ferdinand III and I was Catholic.
The Elector of Württemberg (added in 1803), Frederick I, was Lutheran.
The Elector of Baden (added in 1803), Charles Frederick, was Lutheran.
The Elector of Hesse (added in 1803), William I, was Reformed.

Marks of office

Electoral arms

Below are the State arms of each Imperial Elector. Emblems of Imperial High Offices are shown on the appropriate arms.

Three Electors Spiritual (Archbishops): all three were annexed by various powers through German Mediatisation of 1803.

Four Electors Secular:

Electors added in the 17th century:

Napoleonic additions

As Napoleon waged war on Europe, between 1803 and 1806, the following changes to the Constitution of the Holy Roman Empire were attempted until the Empire's collapse.  Except for the prince Württemberg, who had already inherited his office, the electors were not given augments or high office in the imperial household.

Timeline of electors

See also 

 Elective monarchy
 Electoral Palace (disambiguation)
 Electress
 Imperial election

References

Armorials

Citations

Sources 
 Bryce, J. (1887). The Holy Roman Empire, 8th ed. New York: Macmillan.

External links 
 The Avalon Project. (2003). "The Golden Bull of the Emperor Charles IV 1356 A.D."
 Oestreich, G. and Holzer, E. (1973). " Übersicht über die Reichsstände." In Gebhardt, Bruno. , 9th ed. (Vol. 2, pp. 769–784). Stuttgart: Ernst Ketler Verlag.
 Velde, F. R. (2003). "Royal Styles."
 Velde, F. R. (2004). "The Holy Roman Empire."
 
 Armin Wolf, Electors, published 9 May 2011, english version published 26 February 2020 ; in: Historisches Lexikon Bayerns

1125 establishments in Europe
1120s establishments in the Holy Roman Empire
1866 disestablishments in Germany

German noble titles
Titles of nobility of the Holy Roman Empire

Electoral colleges
Imperial election (Holy Roman Empire)
Monarchy in Germany